Karu Selvaratnam (born 28 January 1941) is a Malaysian sprinter. He competed in the men's 4 × 400 metres relay at the 1964 Summer Olympics.

References

1941 births
Living people
Athletes (track and field) at the 1964 Summer Olympics
Malaysian male sprinters
Malaysian male hurdlers
Olympic athletes of Malaysia
Athletes (track and field) at the 1962 British Empire and Commonwealth Games
Commonwealth Games competitors for Malaya
Athletes (track and field) at the 1962 Asian Games
Asian Games silver medalists for Malaysia
Asian Games bronze medalists for Malaysia
Medalists at the 1962 Asian Games
Asian Games medalists in athletics (track and field)
Place of birth missing (living people)
Southeast Asian Games medalists in athletics
Southeast Asian Games gold medalists for Malaysia
Southeast Asian Games silver medalists for Malaysia